Barcelona Ventures is a seed accelerator and resource platform for European startups to get a foothold in Silicon Valley to connect with investors and expand into the US market. Barcelona Ventures provides mentoring programs, helps coordinate with US legal counsel, immigration services, access to investors, and a Silicon Valley network.

History 
Most of the global venture capital investments are made within the Silicon Valley alone, Francesc Bach, CEO & Founder, found a gap in the market where he saw the need for a large number of European tech companies to raise money in Silicon Valley to grow their businesses.

He then created a Cross-Border Accelerator Program called Barcelona Ventures in 2013 to cater to talented startups in Barcelona that can equally compete and have access to the global stage.

In June of the same year they made the first Investor Forum between Barcelona and San Francisco by video conference, and in December they closed a partnership with Silicon Valley accelerator USMAC.

Since then every year Barcelona Ventures has kept growing and enhancing its Accelerator Program every year, signing partners such as Rakunest in 2018, the Incubator arm of giant Rakuten and backed up by ACCIÓ, an agency of the Government of Catalonia.

Program 
The startups are immersed in a zero-equity 8-week Accelerator Program and the last two weeks are hosted in Silicon Valley. Each cycle culminates in Demo Day, where the startups present their companies to a carefully selected, invite-only audience made up of angel investors and venture capitalists.

Mentors and advisors of the program are composed of individuals with deep industry, investment, or entrepreneurship experience from different industries and countries.

They look for early-stage and top-class founders attacking large, global markets and solving real problems using technology to join the Accelerator Program to help them unlock smart capital from US investors.

References

External links 
 Barcelona Ventures

Business incubators of Spain
Companies based in Barcelona
Financial services companies established in 2013
Startup accelerators
Investment clubs
Venture capital